"Held" is a song by Smog, released as his first single from his 1999 album Knock Knock. The original Drag City-release featured the second single "Cold Blooded Old Times" as a b-side.

"Held" is sometimes covered during concerts by American indie rock band Spoon, and their cover appears on their 2022 album Lucifer on the Sofa. The song also appeared in the 60- and 30-second versions of a commercial advertising the 2008 Cadillac Escalade.

Track listing

Drag City 7" version
Held
Cold Blooded Old Times

Domino 7" version
Held
Look Now
The Only Mother

CD version
Held
Look Now
The Only Mother
Held (acoustic)

Notes

1998 singles
Bill Callahan (musician) songs
Songs written by Bill Callahan (musician)
1998 songs